The Bad Seed is a 2018 American made-for-television horror drama film directed by Rob Lowe for Lifetime. Lowe is also executive producer and stars in the film, alongside Mckenna Grace, Sarah Dugdale, Marci T. House, Lorne Cardinal, Chris Shields, Cara Buono, and a special appearance by Patty McCormack. The horror thriller is based on the 1954 novel by William March, the 1954 play, and the 1956 film. The Bad Seed originally aired on Lifetime on September 9, 2018. This is the second remake of the film, the first being a 1985 film.

On September 16, 2018, a "special edition" of the TV movie was released that features behind the scenes interviews with Lowe, Grace, and McCormack.

A sequel to the film titled The Bad Seed Returns was released on September 5, 2022.

Plot

The film begins as Emma Grossman (Mckenna Grace), a nine-year-old girl and daughter of widowed father David Grossman (Rob Lowe), watches a cat drown in the fountain beneath her bedroom window. She simply draws the blind and prepares for her day. At breakfast, she expresses to her father her hope to win a Citizenship medal handed out each year to a student who exemplifies the values of the school.

The “merit day” (on which the medal is awarded) arrives and Emma is seated in the crowd, certain that she will win the medal. To Emma’s shock and disappointment, Mrs. Ellis (Marci T. House) announces that the winner of this year’s medal is Emma’s classmate Milo Curtis (Luke Roessler).

Later, all students and parents are celebrating outside and Emma expresses contempt for Milo to her father, who scolds her for her bitterness. Emma apologizes, but she secretly guides Milo away from the party and through a nearby patch of trees until they reach rocky cliffs overlooking the sea. She slowly moves towards him and murders him off-screen by pushing him into the sea, after stealing the Citizenship medal from him, and sneaking back into the party. Milo’s body is found shortly thereafter by two girls who scream for help. Emma and David watch from a distance as people desperately try to resuscitate him and his mother breaks down into hysterics.

The next day, David asks Emma if she is feeling okay following what happened to Milo, but Emma acts cheerily and neglects to talk about the matter with any kind of empathy. David’s sister Angela (Cara Buono), a psychiatrist, suggests to David that Emma is in shock and will find time to grieve whenever she is ready. Chloe (Sarah Dugdale), a babysitter David hired, begins work. Emma notices her stealing Xanax from David’s bedroom, and tells her she knows what Chloe did as they are watching a film. Emma utilizes this fact to manipulate Chloe into doing tasks for her such as getting her ice cream and letting her stay up past her bedtime.

Milo’s funeral is held and Emma and David speak with Mr. and Mrs. Curtis (Shauna Johannesen and Robert Egger). Emma feigns sadness in front of them. Mrs. Curtis requests photos of Milo from the day of the ceremony from David. That night, as David peruses the photos he took, he notices Emma in the background of many of them looking at Milo and his medal with a contemptuous scowl, and David grows concerned.

The next day, Mrs. Ellis and an investigator arrive at David’s house to ask him questions, and Emma eavesdrop on the conversation. Mrs. Ellis explains that Emma was the last person to be seen with Milo, having been witnessed taking him into the woods. David becomes anxious and assumes they are insinuating something dark. Chloe appears behind Emma in the next room, deducing that Emma killed Milo. In order to prevent the adults from discussing the matter further, Emma smashes a cookie jar and scratches her arm on broken glass, screaming. Mrs. Ellis and the investigator promptly leave. David asks Emma if she knows anything about being out on the rock-face with Milo, but Emma says she was never out there with Milo and that Mrs. Ellis is lying because she has always hated her.

Whilst Emma and Chloe are out on a walk the next day, Chloe talks to Emma about what she did to Milo, but Emma denies everything. Chloe and Emma spot Mrs. Curtis and the investigator arriving at Milo's house, and Chloe says that Emma better get her story straight or they would capture her for murdering him. Back at the house, Chloe and Emma are eating together and Chloe lies to Emma, saying that if she gets caught for murdering Milo she will be put into a little electric chair for children that’s been painted pink. Emma says she doesn’t believe her but appears worried about the notion. Later on, Mrs. Ellis is seen getting into her car with a wasp nest having been put in it by Emma and she crashes offscreen. Chloe discovers Milo's citizenship medal hidden under Emma’s bed and hangs it from a lamp in David's room so that he will find it.

When David returns home, he does not notice the medal and Emma comes into his room and talks to him. She finds the medal hanging from the lamp and secretly takes it off, hiding it behind her back. David questions her as to what she is hiding and Emma shows him the medal. Distressed, he interrogates her about where she got it and if she was out on the rock face with Milo. Emma admits that she was, but lies and says they played a game and Milo let her wear it for a short time, but that when she left the rock face he didn’t return and so she kept the medal.

David calls his sister Angela to refer Emma to a child psychiatrist because he is extremely worried that Emma may have been involved in Milo’s death and is concerned about her behavior. The next day, David makes Emma return the medal to Mrs. Curtis. That night, he researches antisocial behavior in children and seems convinced that Emma's behavior is psychopathic. The next day, Emma visits a child psychiatrist (Patty McCormack), and acts normally to deceive her. The psychiatrist, named Dr. March, assures David that Emma is “one hundred percent normal”, and he is relieved.

Later, Chloe goes into Emma’s room and taunts her, telling her that she wants to hook up with David and that one day she may become Emma’s stepmother. Emma is disgusted and says that she is going to have David get rid of Chloe. That night David, is readying to leave for a date and Emma reveals the contents of the conversation to him, but he assures her that what Chloe said isn’t true, and Emma states that she does not ever want to have a stepmother.

Chloe is watching a film downstairs and searches for Emma. Seeing that the work-shed lights are on, she goes out of the house and over to the shed and looks around inside for Emma. Emma locks her in and sets the shed on fire, killing Chloe. David rushes home but the emergency services have already arrived. He later goes into Emma’s room, and she is pretending to be asleep, but he questions her about the recent slew of deaths. Emma ultimately admits to murdering Milo, Mrs. Ellis, Chloe, and her previous babysitter who she didn’t like. Emma justifies these murders, claiming she didn’t do anything wrong. David is heartbroken.

The next day, David drives Emma to a lake house a few miles away, evading the suspicious Sheriff Peterson (Chris Shields). He doesn’t want Emma to end up in an institution or in prison and plans to kill her and then himself. Emma senses this, and one night switches on the gas fireplace as well as the iron stoves in the kitchen, attempting to kill David in an explosion.

He wakes up before this can happen and brings Emma back to the lake house. He crushes some medicine and puts it into Emma’s hot chocolate, but Emma switches the mugs without him noticing. He drinks his and when he is asleep, Emma tries to shoot him with his gun but misses. He chases her and Emma calls 911, screaming for help. The caretaker (Lorne Cardinal) of the lake house hears the gunshot and arrives with his shotgun to find David about to kill Emma as he claims that Emma is evil. The caretaker shoots David and Emma remains unharmed as the authorities arrive.

The next morning as David's body is being removed, Emma sits solemnly in the back of a car and hugs her aunt Angela, staring into the distance with a cold and victorious grin.

Cast
 Mckenna Grace as Emma Grossman, a girl who murders anyone who crosses her
 Rob Lowe as David Grossman, Emma's father
 Sarah Dugdale as Chloe, Emma's new nanny.
 Marci T. House as Mrs. Ellis, Emma's teacher.
 Lorne Cardinal as Brian, the caretaker of the Grossmans' lake house.
 Chris Shields as Sheriff Peterson
 Cara Buono as Angela Grossman, David's sister and Emma's aunt who is a known psychiatrist.
 Patty McCormack as Dr. March, Emma's psychiatrist. McCormack received an Oscar nomination for playing the daughter in the 1956 film.
 Luke Roessler as Milo Curtis, Emma's classmate.
 Shauna Johannesen as Maggie Curtis, Milo's mother.
 Robert Egger as Mr. Curtis, Milo's father.
 John Emmet Tracy as Mark Wiggins
 Nevis Unipan as Girl #1
 Anna Dickey as Girl #2
 Juliet Hindle as Girl #3
 Carly Bentall as Mrs. Grossman, David's late wife.

Production
A conventional remake of The Bad Seed, written by Barbara Marshall, had been in development hell between Lifetime and executive producer Mark Wolper. However, it never survived script stage, until late 2017, when Lifetime gave the green light on production. Warner Bros. Television owns the rights to the title. Actor-director Rob Lowe was also named as director and star of the 2018 release, with additional casting to follow. In February 2018, Mckenna Grace and Patty McCormack were announced as being cast.

Reception

Critical reception
The Bad Seed received mixed reviews upon its release. David Feinberg of The Hollywood Reporter said: "Call it The Bad Seed and you tap into a surface-glaze legitimacy that's probably unwarranted, because the movie, notable as co-star Rob Lowe's directing debut, achieves only a baseline amount of trashy fun, nothing more or less." Andrea Reiher from the website Collider said the film "suffers from being neither dark enough nor campy enough—either choice would have been a lot more enjoyable. But it is stuck in a middle area that is devoid of over-the-top absurdity or any real darkness."

Ratings
Upon its initial broadcast on September 9, 2018, The Bad Seed was watched by 1.87 million viewers, placing it in the top ten most-watched cable programs on that date.

Sequel

On November 12, 2021, Lifetime ordered a sequel to the film with Grace set to reprise her role as Emma. It premiered on May 30, 2022.

See also
 List of programs broadcast by Lifetime
 The Bad Seed (1985 film) - An earlier remake of the film.

References

External links
 
 

Lifetime (TV network) films
American drama films
Remakes of American films
Juvenile delinquency in fiction
Films about children
Films about child death
Films based on American novels
Films based on thriller novels
Horror film remakes
Serial killer films
2018 horror films
2018 television films
The Bad Seed
2018 films
2018 directorial debut films
2010s American films